The Dace Raid is an informal name given to a raid conducted by Allied troops in the Pacific in World War Two.

Mission
On 22 March 1944, a party of twelve (including six natives) were off the coast of Hollandia on the US submarine Dace. Their mission was to conduct reconnaissance of the area over fourteen days. Captain "Blue" Harris decided to lead a reconnaissance party of five (including two natives) ashore, but capsized in their rubber boat, losing much of their equipment. A prearranged signal to the submarine to abort the following party was misinterpreted and the remainder of the party was sent apart from one man who was too sill. The party of eleven were onshore with little equipment or food, and limited weaponry. Only five men survived.

Awards
Captain Harris, who was killed by the Japanese was mentioned in dispatches.

References

External links
Photo of men on mission at AWM

Military operations of World War II involving Australia
Military operations involving the Netherlands
20th-century conflicts